is a three-piece Japanese rock band. DOES was formed in 2000 in the Fukuoka prefecture, where they continued to write songs and perform gigs until 2005. In 2005, some members left and the group went on hiatus. Releasing songs since 2004, DOES signed with Ki/oon Records in 2006. In 2008, their 6th single “Donten” reached 3rd on the Oricon weekly music ranking charts. It was also the 5th opening for the anime Gintama.

On April 21, 2010, the band released their single "Bakuchi Dancer." The single sold around 33,000 copies in its initial week and debuted at number 3 on the Oricon weekly charts. The single ended up to be the 30th best selling single for the first half of 2010 and the 74th best single of the entire year.

On November 14, 2012, the band released the single "Yumemiru Sekai" which is also the third opening for Space Brothers.

In summer 2014 they released a CD single called "Guren" to be used as the 15th opening to the anime Naruto: Shippuden.
On August 6, 2014, their special sixth album DOES was on sale.

The band went on a hiatus in 2016 and returned in 2020.

Members
 - Lead vocal, Guitar
 - Bass guitar, Vocals
 - Drums, Vocals

Discography

Independent Releases
"DOES" (March 5, 2004)
"outside" (February 20, 2005)
"fish for you" (June 9, 2005)
"Fish For You No. 2" (March 8, 2006)

Singles
 (September 6, 2006)
 (November 1, 2006)
 (March 21, 2007)
 (May 16, 2007)
5th ending for anime series Gintama
 (October 31, 2007)
 (June 18, 2008)
5th opening for anime series Gintama
 (October 22, 2008)
 (April 8, 2009)
 (April 21, 2010)
1st opening and 1st ending for the film  Gintama: The Movie
 (October 20, 2010)
 Opening theme song for the PSP game Kenka Bancho 5
 (March 14, 2012)
 (November 14, 2012)
3rd opening for anime series Space Brothers
 Guren (July 2, 2014)
15th opening for anime series Naruto: Shippuden
 KNOW KNOW KNOW (March 2, 2016)
17th opening of anime series Gintama

Albums
NEWOLD (November 8, 2006)
SUBTERRANEAN ROMANCE (November 18, 2007)
The World's Edge (April 29, 2009)
Modern Age (December 15, 2010)
KATHARSIVILIZATION (May 9, 2012)
Other side of Does (September 25, 2013)
DOES (August 6, 2014)
Innocence (April 27, 2016)

References

External links
 DOES old official website 
 DOES new official website 

Japanese garage rock groups
Japanese hard rock musical groups
Japanese alternative rock groups
Ki/oon Music artists
Musical groups from Fukuoka Prefecture